Triplemanía IV-A was a major lucha libre, or professional wrestling, show promoted by the Mexican-based AAA and was the first of three Triplemanía IV shows held in 1996. The event took place on May 11, 1996 at the International Amphitheatre in Chicago, Illinois, United States and marked the first time AAA held a Triplemanía outside of Mexico and one of the few times Triplemanía was an international event. The annual Triplemanía show(s) are AAA's biggest show of the year, serving as the culmination of major storylines and feature wrestlers from all over the world competing in what has been described as AAA's version of WrestleMania or their Super Bowl event.

The main event featured a Lumberjack match between the team of Konnan and Perro Aguayo fighting Pierroth, Jr. and Cien Caras. The under card featured a guest appearance by Japanese wrestler Último Dragón, who had begun a tour of Mexico weeks before the show, teaming up with Octagón and La Parka to lose to Cibernético, El Picudo and Mosco de la Merced in a traditional best two-out-of-three falls six-man "Lucha Libre rules" tag team match. The show only featured two additional matches, making it the Triplemanía show with the fewest matches.

Production

Background
Just like in 1994 and 1995 AAA planned out three Triplemanía events in 1994, the first slated for May 11, the Second Triplemanía IV show was booked for June 15 in Orizaba, Veracruz and the Third Triplemanía IV on July 15 in Madero. AAA promoter Antonio Peña wanted to expand AAA into the United States, building on the success they had so far in both Los Angeles and Chicago up to that point and the first Triplemanía IV would take place in Chicago at the International Amphitheatre, a building with a capacity to hold 9,000 people for most events. The show in Chicago was filled with a number of behind the scenes problems that plagued the event. AAA had chosen exactly the same date for the show as the wedding of Óscar Gutiérrez, one of AAA"s top stars known under the ring name Rey Misterio Jr., which meant that both he and his best man Dionicio Castellanos, better known as Psicosis would not be able to work the show. Despite the two not being able to work the show AAA still promoted them for the show. AAA was also adverting that Eddie Guerrero would appear on the show, but Guerrero was working in Japan at the time and was never contacted to be part of the show. The local event promoters in Chicago that AAA had partnered with did not do a very good job of promoting the event either, leading to only 2,676 people showing up for the event, filing less than one-third of all the seats in the Amphitheater. The attendance was the second lowest in the history of Triplemanía, with only Triplemanía VIII having a lower attendance number, 1,700 but took place in the much smaller Korakuen Hall with a capacity of around 2,000. The show was reportedly hit with a number of "no shows" beyond Rey Misterio Jr. and Psicosis, which caused AAA to have to rebook the entire event on the night of the show. In total only 20 wrestlers worked the show, the lowest number of wrestlers to ever appear at a Triplemanía show at that point. It is not clear if the show was taped for later broadcast or not, but no footage from this particular show has ever been shown, making it the only Triplemanía not to be accessible to anyone outside of the arena.

Storylines
The Triplemanía show featured four professional wrestling matches with different wrestlers involved in pre-existing scripted feuds, plots and storylines. Wrestlers were portrayed as either heels (referred to as rudos in Mexico, those that portray the "bad guys") or faces (técnicos in Mexico, the "good guy" characters) as they followed a series of tension-building events, which culminated in a wrestling match or series of matches.

Reception
In a 2000 article about the history of the Triplemanía up until that point Canadian Online Explorer wrestling writer John Molinario described the show as "the worst show in TripleMania history". He also stated that the overall booking of the Triplemanía IV shows was "uninspired and repetitive. Pena recycled old angles that no longer registered with his audience." Wrestling commentator and lucha libre expert Mike Tenay noted that "Chicago was a joke, a real disaster" and that " Pena's poor promotional background and track record finally haunted him" stating that at this point AAA no longer had the big name stars to overcome the lack of advertising from AAA's side. Wrestling Observer Newsletter editor Dave Meltzer noted that by 1996 the Triplemanía show became "just a name for a bigger than average house show rather than the first year where it was like a WrestleMania."

Results

References

External links
Triplemanía IV at LuchaLibreAAA.com

1996 in professional wrestling
Triplemanía
1990s in Chicago
1996 in Illinois
Events in Chicago
Professional wrestling in the Chicago metropolitan area
May 1996 events in the United States

es:Triplemanía IV